Army Men: World War - Land, Sea, Air is a third-person shooter video game developed and published by The 3DO Company exclusively for PlayStation, released in 2000.

The PAL version is simply titled Army Men: Land, Sea, Air, with a different cover art.

Gameplay

Single-player & Multi-player
Army Men: World War - Land, Sea, Air features two modes for single player: Campaign and Boot Camp, as well as featuring a two-player "capture the flag" multiplayer mode. The player can choose from three difficulties: Easy, medium or hard.

Campaign
The Campaign is the main mode for Army Men: World War - Land, Sea, Air. Set in a "realistic" setting like the previous Army Men, it features 15 missions in total, which involves the player (as a Green soldier) completing certain objectives that may involve intercepting vehicles, escorting friendly soldiers and killing enemies on land, sea or air. The plot begins with the Tan Army attacking the Green Army by air and the Green Army later taking revenge, with the narrator announcing: "We shall beat them on all fronts, returning force with force, whether it be by land, sea or air."

Boot Camp
Boot Camp is a training level in which the player learns the controls. It consists of training areas for all weapons and an obstacle course.

Reception

The game received "generally unfavorable reviews" according to the review aggregation website Metacritic. IGN called it "awful" for its "shoddy controls, horrible clipping, lousy animation" and "bland grainy textures". Emmett Schkloven of NextGen, however, said of the game, "Fire up the newsreels and propaganda – the Army Men are back with a much better World War."

References

External links

2000 video games
Army Men
Multiplayer and single-player video games
PlayStation (console) games
PlayStation (console)-only games
Video games developed in the United States